Kelcyre Castle is a castle near the city of Këlcyrë. The castle was first built in the 3rd-4th Century BC. By the Illyrian Tribes in the Region.

See also
Këlcyrë
Gorge of Këlcyrë
Illyrians
List of castles in Albania
Tourism in Albania
History of Albania
Architecture of Albania

References

External links

Castles in Albania